The CONMEBOL Jubilee Awards. The "South American Football Confederation" (CONMEBOL, or CSF;) is the continental governing body of football in South America, established in 1916.

By Countries
 Argentina - Diego Armando Maradona
 Bolivia - Marco Etcheverry
 Brazil - Pelé
 Chile - Elías Figueroa
 Colombia - Carlos Valderrama
 Ecuador - Alberto Spencer
 Paraguay - Romerito
 Perú - Teófilo Cubillas
 Uruguay - Enzo Francescoli
 Venezuela - Juan Arango * 

(* on activity)

References

External links
CONMEBOL - Official Web Site

CONMEBOL trophies and awards